The Lappa Valley Railway is a  minimum gauge railway located near Newquay in Cornwall. The railway functions as a tourist attraction, running from Benny Halt to East Wheal Rose, where there is a leisure area with two miniature railways.

History

Treffry's Tramway
In 1843, Joseph Treffry suggested building a tramway between Par and Newquay, with a branch line to the East Wheal Rose silver lead mine, which at the time was entering its most prosperous period.  Treffry spent six years trying to overcome public opposition to the tramway and was forced to modify his intended route.  The Treffry Tramways were eventually built from Newquay to St. Dennis with the branch line to East Wheal Rose, and the first load of ore left East Wheal Rose on 26 February 1849 in horse-drawn tubs.  1874 saw the Treffry's network of tramways taken over by the Cornwall Minerals Railway, who introduced steam locomotives to the line.

Great Western Railway

The Great Western Railway took over the Cornish Minerals Railway in 1896, and incorporated the East Wheal Rose branch into a new railway from Newquay to Chacewater via. Perranporth.  This new railway was opened in 1905, and enabled passengers to reach the market town of Truro much quicker than they had before.  The Newquay to Chacewater branch line also proved popular for holidaymakers.  The railway closed on 4 February 1963 under the Beeching cuts.

Lappa Valley Steam Railway
The Lappa Valley Steam Railway was established by Eric Booth in the 1970s. A brand new steam locomotive Zebedee was built for the line by Severn Lamb, arriving in early 1974 with 4 locally-built carriages. The railway opened to the public on 16 June 1974. A large boating lake was dug at East Wheal Rose in 1975 to drain the area, and the whole East Wheal Rose area landscaped. More locomotives arrived from Longleat in 1976, with more carriages also being built at the time. In the 1970s a  gauge railway was laid around a smaller boating lake, whilst a third railway, of  gauge, running a further  along the old trackbed was opened in May 1995.

In 2014 a new owner acquired the railway and made various improvements. A new visitor attraction called the 'Engine Shed' opened in 2021.

The route of Lappa Valley
 Benny Halt
 East Wheal Rose

East Wheal Rose
At East Wheal Rose, the  gauge Newlyn Branch Line and  gauge Woodland Railway depart from the top station on the Newlyn Branch Line, where there is another children's play area.

There are two lakes, the biggest being the boating lake, the second smaller lake being the wildlife lake, a crazy golf course and many children's play areas.  Also there are a gift shop and licensed café, and a brick path maze depicting the first steam locomotive built by Richard Trevithick, along with many walks through the valley.

Stocklist

External links

 Railway website

Lappa Valley Steam Railway
15 in gauge railways in England
Miniature railways in the United Kingdom